São Jacinto Dunes Natural Reserve is a natural reserve, in Aveiro, Portugal in central Portugal. It is one of the 30 areas which are officially under protection in the country.

Nature reserves in Portugal
Geography of Aveiro District
Tourist attractions in Aveiro District